Václav Mašek (born 21 March 1941) is a Czech football player who played as a striker. He was a member of the Czechoslovakia national football team, for which he played 16 matches and scored 5 goals.

In Czechoslovakia, he played 313 league matches and scored 127 goals for Sparta Prague.

He was a participant in the 1962 FIFA World Cup, where his country were runners up, losing to Brazil in the final. In a match against Mexico, he became famous for scoring a goal after only 16 seconds of play, the fastest goal in World Cup history until forty years later, when his record was beaten by Hakan Şükür of Turkey, by scoring after 11 seconds in the 3rd place match of the 2002 FIFA World Cup.

References

1941 births
Living people
Footballers from Prague
Czech footballers
Czechoslovak footballers
1962 FIFA World Cup players
Czechoslovakia international footballers
AC Sparta Prague players
Dukla Prague footballers
Association football forwards